Katihar Assembly constituency  is an assembly constituency in Katihar district in the Indian state of Bihar.

Overview
As per Delimitation of Parliamentary and Assembly constituencies Order, 2008, No 63. Katihar Assembly constituency is composed of the following: Katihar community development block including Katihar nagar parishad; and Hasanganj CD Block. In 2015 Bihar Legislative Assembly election, Katihar will be one of the 36 seats to have VVPAT enabled electronic voting machines.

Katihar Assembly constituency is part of No 11 Katihar (Lok Sabha constituency).

Members of Legislative Assembly

Election results

2020

2015 Vidhan Sabha Elections
 Tar Kishore Prasad (BJP) : 66,048 votes 
 Bijay Singh (JD-U) : 51,154
 Ram Prakash Mahato (NCP) : 18,856

1977 Vidhan Sabha Elections
 Jagbandhu Adhikari (JNP) : 27,588 votes 
 Raj Kishare Prasad Singh (CPI) : 6684

1972 Vidhan Sabha Elections
 Rajkishor Prasad Singh (CPI) : 18,315 votes   
 Satya Narayan Biswas (IND) : 13,127
 Jagdish Prasad Mandal (Jana Sangh) : 10,945

References

External links
 

Assembly constituencies of Bihar
Politics of Katihar district
Katihar